Dennis Chun (born March 18, 1952) is an American actor. He is the son of Hawaii Five-O star Kam Fong Chun, and portrayed Sgt. Duke Lukela in the reboot of the series, in which his father was known for playing Chin Ho Kelly from the original show.

Filmography
1972: The Brady Bunch: Young Workman
1974: Inferno in Paradise: Kimo
1974–1975: Hawaii Five-O: Officer Wade/Assistant/Attendant 
1988: Magnum, P.I.: William Chun
1989–1990: Jake and the Fatman: Detective/Johnny Witt
1991: Goodbye Paradise: John Young
2010–2020: Hawaii Five-0: Sgt. Duke Lukela
2019–2022: Magnum P.I.: Sgt. Duke Lukela

References

External links

 

1952 births
Living people
20th-century American male actors
21st-century American male actors
American male television actors
Male actors from Hawaii